Ill-Gotten Gaines may refer to:

 "Ill-Gotten Gaines" (1990), an episode of Cop Rock
 "Ill-Gotten Gaines" (1992), an episode of Cheers

See also
 Ill Gotten Gains, a 1997 film
 Ill Gotten Gains, a 2016 miniseries presented by Rav Wilding